Specktors is a Danish hip hop group formed in 2008 by Sluzh, Jonas For Fa'en, Wanr and Anders "Drysset" Drøidal. When Drøidal left the band, he wasn't replaced and Specktors became a trio. The band usually combines hip hop with electronic influences. The band is signed to EMI Denmark.

Specktors started working in the Copenhagen underground / club scene and in April 2008 launched a tour all over Denmark. They had their break when their song "Hellerup Ansigt // Amar Røv" was played by DJ Kjeld Tolstrup on Denmark's P3 radio program Unga Bunga. Soon after they landed a deal in  2009 with Music For Dreams label, where they released their debut album Shanksville on 9 September 2009 (090909). The album included collaborations with MagerMayn, Pato Siebenhaar, MC Ena (from Fagget Fairys) and Jokeren.

In summers of 2011 and 2012, they performed at the Roskilde Festival. In 2012, they made some mixtapes, releasing in June 2012 their second album Kadavermarch. The first track to release as a single was "Lågsus", a huge hit featuring Danish singer Medina going straight to #1 on Tracklisten, the official Danish Singles Chart.

Discography

Albums
{| class="wikitable plainrowheaders" style="text-align:center;"
|-
! scope="col" rowspan="2"| Title
! scope="col" rowspan="2"| Album Details
! scope="col" colspan="1"| Peak chart positions
|-
! scope="col" style="width:3em;font-size:85%;"| DEN
|-
! scope="row"| Shanksville
|
 Released: 9 September 2009
 Label: Music for Dreams
 Formats: CD, digital download
| —
|-
! scope="row"| Vi ved at du ved det
|
 Released: 13 May 2011
 Label: Self-released
 Format: Digital download
| —
|-
! scope="row"| Kadavermarch|
 Released: 25 June 2012
 Label: EMI Music Denmark
 Formats: CD, digital download
| 11
|-
! scope="row"| 4 Life''
|
 Released: 8 May 2020
 Label: Warner Music
 Format: Digital download, streaming
| 27
|}

SinglesFeatured in'''

References

External links
Official website
Facebook

Danish hip hop groups